Fatiné is a rural commune in the Cercle of Ségou in the Ségou Region of Mali. The commune includes 29 villages in an area of approximately 1006 square kilometers. In the 2009 census it had a population of 25,161. The Bani River runs along the southern boundary of the commune. The administrative center (chef-lieu) is the village of Fatiné Marka.

References

External links
.
.

Communes of Ségou Region